Curtis–Grace House, also known as the Roy and Leona Curtis House and Richard and Connie Grace House, is a historic home located at West Lafayette, Tippecanoe County, Indiana.  It was built in 1958, and is a two-story, banked, post-and-beam Modern Movement style dwelling, with a broad, low-pitched offset gable roof. It is constructed of concrete block, redwood, natural stone, and plate glass. The overall dimensions are approximately 82 feet by 23 feet.  The surrounding landscaped property is a contributing site.

It was listed on the National Register of Historic Places in 2012.

References

Houses on the National Register of Historic Places in Indiana
Modernist architecture in Indiana
Houses completed in 1958
Houses in Tippecanoe County, Indiana
National Register of Historic Places in Tippecanoe County, Indiana